A subway, also known as an underpass, is a grade-separated pedestrian crossing which crosses underneath a road or railway in order to entirely separate pedestrians and cyclists from motor traffic or trains respectively.

Terminology 

In the United States, as used by the California Department of Transportation and in parts of Pennsylvania such as Harrisburg, Duncannon and Wyoming County, subway refers to a depressed road undercrossing. Where they are built elsewhere in the country, the term 'pedestrian underpass' is more likely to be used, because "subway" in North America refers to rapid transit systems such as the New York City Subway or the Toronto Subway. This usage also occurs in Scotland, where the underground railway in Glasgow is referred to as the Glasgow Subway.

Effects 
Pedestrian underpasses allow for the uninterrupted flow of both pedestrians and vehicle traffic. However, they are normally considered a last resort by modern urban planners as they can be expensive and cause graffiti and security issues.

Pedestrians will not use an underpass where a more direct at-grade option is available.

Badly designed subways may not provide for disabled users, especially those in a wheelchair who cannot use stairs. As the underpass is normally below the level of the footway and carriageway (rather than the carriageway being lifted over the road), technologies such as stairs, lifts and ramps must be used. A subway under the A38 in Birmingham city centre was criticised for having a ramp on one side but only stairs on the other side.

Usage in different countries 

Subways are characteristic of European post-war suburbs and new towns. In Milton Keynes, a new town in the UK, alongside the grid of expressways are a system of shared-use paths known as redways. To reduce conflict with the grid system vehicle traffic (which normally has high speeds), redways normally run underneath grid roads.

In the Netherlands, underpasses for cyclists and pedestrians are often built as part of bikeways, often to replace level crossings or at-grade cyclist/pedestrian crossings. At Bilthoven station, the cycle track and major road previously crossed the railway at grade. To reduce delays, new separate underpasses were built, with motor traffic given a longer route than active travel modes. In 's-Hertogenbosch, the urban ring road has only one level crossing, but has ten overpasses and fourteen underpasses to ensure the road does not form a barrier to cyclists and pedestrians.

Subways are less common in North American cities than in European cities of comparable size. They are constructed when it is necessary for pedestrians to cross a railway line or a dual carriageway such as an interstate highway, and they appear at the exits from underground rapid transit systems, but one would be rarely built to enable people to cross an ordinary city street.

In the Philippines, the term is also underpass, and there are two types: underpasses for pedestrians such as along Ayala Avenue in Makati and in the City of Manila near Quiapo Church, and vehicular ones along the length of EDSA and other thoroughfares. One of the earliest and most notable vehicular underpasses is the "Lagusnilad" in front of Manila City Hall.

Art 

Subways can present an opportunity for public art projects, especially murals. Most cycle underpasses in the Netherlands have works of art on the walls to make the tunnels less scary. Such public art projects can be community projects to showcase the work of local and lesser-known artists, and can receive positive feedback from members of the public. If done as acts of protest, such art projects can be controversial. In 2021, a mural painted by in Passaic County, New Jersey by Black Lives Matter activists was ordered to be removed by local officials after they received complaints.

Wildlife tunnels 

Subways can also be designed for users other than pedestrians or cyclists. Wildlife tunnels allow animals to safely cross busy roads, reducing the risk of animal-vehicle collisions. They can also be used by humans walking on trails through nature reserves.

Gallery

See also 
 Tunnel

References

External links

 
Types of thoroughfares
Articles containing video clips